"She Is Love" is a song by English rock band Oasis, first released as the ninth track on their fifth studio album, Heathen Chemistry, written and sung by guitarist Noel Gallagher. In September 2002, it was released with "Little by Little" as the first double A-sided single by the band, peaking at number two on the UK Singles Chart (see 2002 in British music). The song was written about Noel Gallagher's girlfriend Sara McDonald and is a light, acoustic song about being in love.

Gallagher claims it was written in the Buckingham Gate Hotel in London, and that it took 30 minutes to complete. The band commissioned British fashion art director Rachel Thomas to make a promo video for the song. However, the resulting film, a mix of animation and live action, has never been released on any format. This track is also included on the compilation album Time Flies... 1994–2009.

Inspiration
It appears that Gallagher borrowed sentiments from Khalil Gibran's book The Prophet.

"When love beckons to you, follow him, Though his ways are hard and steep. And when his wings enfold you yield to him, though the sword hidden among his pinions may wound you."

John Lennon also borrowed from the same author for his song "Julia".

Track listings
 7-inch (RKID 26), CD (RKIDSCD 26), 12-inch (RKID 26T)
 "Little by Little" – 4:57
 "She Is Love" – 3:11
 "My Generation" – 4:05 (CD and 12" only)
 "My Generation" was recorded live at the BBC's Maida Vale studios on 20 January 2000. The sleevenotes claim it was recorded on 7 February 2000 but this was the transmission date, not the recording date.

 DVD (RKIDSDVD 26)
 "Little by Little" – 5:02
 "Little by Little" (demo) – 4:55
 10 minutes of noise and confusion – pt three – 8:31
 The third part of the "10 Minutes..." documentary looks behind the scenes of their sell out shows at Finsbury Park in London from 5 to 7 July 2002.

Personnel
 Noel Gallagher – lead vocals, acoustic guitar, electric guitar
 Gem Archer – acoustic guitar
 Alan White – tambourine, handclaps
 Mike Rowe – pump organ, hammond organ

Charts
All entries charted with "Little by Little".

Weekly charts

Year-end charts

Release history

References

2002 singles
Oasis (band) songs
Songs written by Noel Gallagher
Song recordings produced by Andy Bell (musician)
Song recordings produced by Gem Archer
Song recordings produced by Liam Gallagher
Song recordings produced by Noel Gallagher

fi:Little by Little / She is Love